Sullivan, West Virginia may refer to:

Sullivan, Raleigh County, West Virginia, an unincorporated community in Raleigh County
Sullivan, Randolph County, West Virginia, an unincorporated community in Randolph County